Charlotte Country Day School is a private, secular school in Charlotte, North Carolina, with classes in grades Junior Kindergarten – 12. The school is accredited by the Southern Association of Colleges and Schools and Southern Association of Independent Schools.

History 
Charlotte Country Day School was founded as an independent school in 1941 by headmaster Dr. Thomas Burton, with the intention to "meet the special requirements of the college-bound youth." The school opened in September 1941 with 18 students matriculating in the former Stuart W. Cramer Home on East Morehead Street near uptown Charlotte, North Carolina. By 1945 the Country Day included grades 1 – 8 and had an enrollment of 56 students on a six-acre school site on Sardis Road in suburban Charlotte.

The estate of the Martin L. Cannon Jr. made a gift in 1958 that allowed the school to build a new eight building campus on a 30-acre site donated by Mr. and Mrs. James G. Harris on Carmel Road. With the opening of the Cannon Campus, Country Day expanded to a K – 12 college preparatory school. The new campus increased total enrollment capacity from 235 students to 400 students. In 1962 the school graduated its first class of 15 high school seniors.

The advent of busing in the Charlotte Mecklenburg School system caused many independent schools in the region to experience rapid growth in the early 1970s. Country Day had started in 1941 and was not founded in response to desegregation, but it saw an influx of hundreds of new applications during this period. Journalists found it likely that its enrollment benefitted from parents seeking to avoid busing in the public school system. By the 1974-75 school year, Country Day had grown to total enrollment of 873 students in grades K-12.

In 1980 Country Day merged with Carmel Academy, one of several independent schools established in Mecklenburg County in the wake of the Swann decision in 1971. The merger put Carmel Academy, previously operating with no endowment, on more secure financial footing. After combining the schools, middle school grades 5 – 8 moved to the Carmel Academy campus (today referred to as the Bissell campus), about four miles away from the main Cannon campus. The newly combined school changed its mascot from the Rebels to the Buccaneers as part of the merger.

Cannon campus 
Cannon Campus for grades JK–4 and 9–12 has 15 buildings, including a full-service dining hall, two libraries, a 400-seat theater, two reading gardens, and multiple computer labs.

The Cannon campus was newly renovated at the end of 2018.  The Purdy Math and Science building is the newest addition to the Cannon campus. Future renovations include a new building with a swimming pool and athletic center, which have begun construction.

Bissell campus 
Bissell Campus, where CCDS students in grades 5–8 attend classes, underwent extensive renovations in 2009. The  Dowd Science Building was completed, which added eight science lecture/lab classrooms and two general purpose classrooms. The old science building was renovated to create six foreign language classrooms. Grounds enhancements included a new entryway and fencing, a new front courtyard, and new tennis courts and practice fields.

Elsewhere on Bissell Campus, the Sklut Center has three art rooms, the cafeteria, and the general music room. A separate building is dedicated entirely to the natural sciences.

Notable alumni 

 Robert StanfieldDoctor at Harvard Medical School
 Zac Alleycollege football coach 
 William ByronNASCAR Cup Series driver for the legendary Hendrick Motorsports Car No. 24.
 Ed Cashproducer, songwriter, engineer, and multi-instrumentalist
 Mike CoferNFL kicker, two-time Super Bowl champion, and NASCAR driver
 Brian Huskeyactor and comedian
 Tracey Ann Kellyaward-winning American television soap opera script writer
 Kristen Anderson-Lopezoscar-winning songwriter best known for co-writing the song "Let It Go" in the movie Frozen
 Ross McElweedocumentary filmmaker, including Sherman’s March: the 1986 Best Documentary at the Sundance Film Festival, National Board of Film Critics Five Best Films of 1986, and selected for preservation by the Library of Congress National Film Registry for its historical significance
 Brandon Millerprofessional soccer player
 Wes Millercollege basketball head coach and former player
 Edwin Peacock IIIat-large representative on the Charlotte City Council
 Alvin PearmanNFL running back
 Tripp Phillipsformer professional tennis player
 Marcus Smithpresident and CEO of Speedway Motorsports, Inc.
Frank Whitneyfederal judge for Western North Carolina

References

External links
Charlotte Country Day School

Schools in Charlotte, North Carolina
Private high schools in North Carolina
Private middle schools in North Carolina
Private elementary schools in North Carolina